The Watson Institute for International and Public Affairs is an interdisciplinary research center at Brown University in Providence, Rhode Island. Its mission is to promote a just and peaceful world through research, teaching, and public engagement. The institute's research focuses on three main areas: development, security, and governance. Its faculty include anthropologists, economists, political scientists, sociologists, and historians, as well as journalists and other practitioners. 

The institute is directed by Edward Steinfeld, professor in the Department of Political Science, and director of the China Initiative at Brown University.

Location
The Institute occupies three buildings surrounding a central plaza located at the southern edge Brown's campus on the East Side of Providence, Rhode Island. The first is a modern and architecturally distinctive building at 111 Thayer Street, designed by Uruguayan architect Rafael Viñoly in 2001. The second, Stephen Robert 62' Hall, is a glass-walled structure at 280 Brook Street designed by architect Toshiko Mori and completed in 2018. The institute also occupies a 19th-century building at 59 Charlesfield Street renovated in 2018.

History
The Watson Institute for International and Public Affairs was established to fulfill two parallel missions: "to bring international perspective into the life of Brown University, and to promote peace through international relations research and policy." In 1981, with the support and guidance of 1937 Brown alumnus Thomas J. Watson Jr., former chairman of IBM and Ambassador to the Soviet Union, Brown University founded the Center for Foreign Policy Development. The center was formed to explore solutions to the major global issues of the day, foremost of which was the possibility of a nuclear encounter between the United States and the Soviet Union. In 1986, the university created the Institute for International Studies to integrate the Center and Brown's other international programs.

In 1991, following a $25 million gift from Watson, the institute was rededicated in his honor. Originally housed in five separate locations on campus, the institute's programs moved into a single building at 111 Thayer Street, designed by architect Rafael Viñoly, in January 2002.

2014-2019: Expansion

In 2014, the Watson Institute merged with the Taubman Center for American Politics and Policy, which had previously been housed in the Department of Political Science. Speaking of the motivation behind the merger, then–director Richard M. Locke cited the increasingly inseparable nature of domestic and foreign policy.

In 2015, the Institute received a $50 million gift to expand facilities and hire additional faculty. This gift enabled the construction of a new building at 280 Brook Street and renovation of an existing building at 59 Charlesfield Street.

In 2019, the Institute established the Center for Human Rights and Humanitarian Studies (CHR&HS) as a permanent and endowed center. The center replaced the Humanitarian Innovation Initiative, which was established in 2016.

Academic programs
The Watson Institute offers a single undergraduate degree program in International and Public Affairs. The concentration features both a core curriculum as well as three specialized tracks (Development, Security, and Policy & Governance) among which students can choose.

Graduate programs offered at the Watson Institute include the Graduate Program in Development (Ph.D.) and the Public Policy Program (M.P.A.). The Graduate Program in Development (GPD) is an NSF-funded, interdisciplinary program that supports the training of PhD candidates in anthropology, political science, economics, and sociology. The Public Policy program is a one-year intensive (summer – fall – spring) full-time degree with a focus on quantitative policy analysis and management. Since 2017, the institute has also offered a fifth year M.P.A program for Brown undergraduates.

The institute also offers Post Doctoral, professional development and global outreach programming.

Area studies
The following area studies centers are based at Watson: the Brazil Initiative, the Africa Initiative, the Center for Contemporary South Asia (CCSA), the Center for Latin American and Caribbean Studies (CLACS), the China Initiative, and Middle East Studies (MES).

Professional programs
Two professional outreach programs are based at the institute. The Brown International Advanced Research Institutes (BIARI) provides the opportunity for junior scholars and practitioners from all over the world to study together at the institute. According to Watson's website, BIARI "aims to build transnational scholarly networks while also providing opportunities for professional development. Each summer, BIARI brings promising young faculty from the Global South together with leading scholars in their fields for two-week intensive residential institutes."

Choices develops and publishes curriculum resources for high school social studies classrooms, and leads seminars for secondary school teachers. The program's mission is "to equip young people with the skills, habits, and knowledge necessary to be engaged citizens who are capable of addressing international issues with thoughtful public discourse and informed decision making."

Research

Costs of War Project 

In recent years, the most internationally cited product of the Watson Institute has been its Costs of War Project, first released in 2011 and continuously updated since. The project comprises a team of economists, anthropologists, political scientists, legal experts, and physicians, and seeks to calculate the economic costs, human casualties, and impact on civil liberties of the wars in Iraq, Afghanistan, and Pakistan since 2001. The project is the most extensive and comprehensive public accounting of the cost of post-September 11th U.S. military operations compiled to date.

Publications
The Watson Institute is the editorial home to three academic journals:
Brown Journal of World Affairs
Studies in Comparative International Development
Journal of Health Politics, Policy and Law

Watson also publishes a working paper series, distributed by SSRN:
Watson Working Papers

Notable faculty and fellows

Diplomats and politicians 
Notable diplomats who have served as faculty and fellows at the Watson Institute include 22nd U.S. Ambassador to the United Nations, Richard Holbrooke and former deputy secretary-general of the OECD and 11th Administrator of the U.S. Agency for International Development, J. Brian Atwood. Heads of state and government who have served as faculty and fellows include the 34th President of Brazil,uuuu Fernando Henrique Cardoso; the 31st President of Chile, Ricardo Lagos; former Chancellor of Austria, Alfred Gusenbauer; and two-time Prime Minister of Italy, Romano Prodi. Other fellows and faculty of note include the 12th president of the World Bank, Jim Yong Kim; former Chair of the Democratic National Committee and Secretary of Labor, Tom Perez; 7th lieutenant governor of Maryland, Michael Steele; Kenyan activist Kakenya Ntaiya; and 16th Chief Economic Advisor to the Government of India, Arvind Subramanian.

Academics 

 Nadje Sadig Al-Ali, Director, Middle East Studies
 Omer Bartov, Faculty Fellow
 Mark Blyth, Director, William R. Rhodes Center for International Economics and Finance
 Robert K. Brigham, former Visiting Professor of International Relations
 James Der Derian, former Professor of Research
 Peter B. Evans, Faculty Fellow
 John Friedman, Professor of Economics and International and Public Affairs
 Justine Hastings, Professor of Economics and International and Public Affairs
 Shirley Brice Heath, Professor-at-large (2003-2010)
 Patrick Heller, Director, Development Rsearch Program
 Eugene Jarecki, Visiting Fellow
 Stephen Kinzer, Senior Fellow
 David Kertzer, Faculty Fellow, recipient of the Pulitzer Prize
 Margaret Levi, Senior Fellow (2013–14)
 Glenn Loury, Professor of Economics
 Catherine Lutz, Professor of Anthropology
 Rose McDermott, Director, Postdoctoral Program
 Brian C. O'Neill, former Associate Professor (Research)
 Emily Oster, Professor of Economics
 Eric M. Patashnik, Professor of Political Science
 Wendy J. Schiller, Professor of Political Science
 Galina Starovoytova, former Visiting Scholar
 J. Ann Tickner, Visiting Adjunct Professor (2004–2009)
Ashutosh Varshney, Director, Center for Contemporary South Asia
 Robert Wade, Professor of International Political Economy (1996–99)
Margaret Weir, Professor of International and Public Affairs and Political Science
Thomas G. Weiss, Associate Director, Research Professor (1990–98)
 Xu Wenli, Visiting Senior Fellow

Directors 

 Howard Swearer (1986–1991)
 Vartan Gregorian (1991–1994)
 Thomas J. Biersteker, (1994–06)
 Barbara Stallings, (2006–2008)
 Michael D. Kennedy, (2009–11)
 Richard M. Locke, (2013–16)
 Edward Steinfeld, (2016–present)

References

External links
 Watson Institute for International Studies

Brown University
Schools of international relations in the United States
Security studies
Public administration schools
Public policy schools
Realist think tanks
Peace and conflict studies
Foreign policy and strategy think tanks in the United States
Rafael Viñoly buildings
Research institutes of international relations
1981 establishments in Rhode Island